Boddam may refer to:

People
 Charles Boddam (1762–1811), East India Company writer and judge
 Edmond Boddam (1879–1959), Australian cricketer
 Rawson Hart Boddam (1734–1812), Governor of the Bombay Presidency under the East India Company, father of Charles Boddam

Places
 Boddam, Aberdeenshire, Scotland, a village
 Boddam, Shetland, Scotland, a village
 Île Boddam, an islet in the Salomon Islands, British Indian Ocean Territory

Other uses
 Boddam (1787 EIC ship), a ship of the British East India Company launched in 1787
 Boddam railway station, Boddam, Aberdeenshire, Scotland